CreativeMornings is a free monthly breakfast lecture series designed for creative communities. In 2008, Tina Roth-Eisenberg founded the lecture series in Brooklyn, New York as an ongoing, accessible event for New York's creative community. The concept was simple: breakfast and a short talk one Friday morning a month. Every event would be free of charge and open to anyone.

Lecturers include professional creators, designers, photographers and illustrators. CreativeMornings hosts events in 207 cities worldwide in 65 countries. Their events are run by approximately 1,500 volunteer organizers.

History
In 2008, Tina Roth-Eisenberg founded CreativeMornings in Brooklyn, New York. It was founded to facilitate creative communities and provide a space for people to share and discuss their work. The lecture series expanded to Zurich, Switzerland and Los Angeles, California in 2010. In February 2011, San Francisco established a CreativeMornings chapter. That July, the lecture series expanded to the United Kingdom. CreativeMornings partnered with John Maeda, President of the Rhode Island School of Design and its STEM to STEAM initiative to host a series of unified events in May 2012. Louisville, Kentucky established a CreativeMornings chapter that December. It was the 101st city to join the organization.

Locations
CreativeMornings has chapters in over 215 cities worldwide including New York City, Boston, Paris, Zurich, Berlin, Trondheim, Lagos, Mexico City, Milan, Montevideo, Bangkok, Hanoi, Tabriz, Seoul, Sydney, Singapore, Lagos, Bogotá, Tehran, Isfahan and Cape Town. Each chapter is produced and led by a local host organizer with the support of local volunteer organizers.

Events
Lectures are held on a Friday morning once a month and include breakfast and a short talk. The goal of CreativeMornings is to host a city's creative community and encourage conversation while being inspired by a guest speaker. The topics of the lecture series range from education and urbanism to bravery and food. Presentations are filmed and archived online for public access.

Notes

External links
 CreativeMornings.com

Non-profit organizations based in New York City
Recurring events established in 2008
American educational websites
2008 establishments in the United States